Warren R. Smith (July 20, 1889 – December 4, 1957) was the State Treasurer of Wisconsin from 1947 until his death in office.

Born in Oconto, Wisconsin, Smith attended Oshkosh State College and Marquette University. He taught school and also worked as a real estate broker, grocer, building manager, accountant, and auditor. He was elected state treasurer of Wisconsin in 1946 and served until his death in Madison on December 4, 1957 from complications of a stroke. He was a Republican. He was buried at Wanderer's Rest Cemetery (a.k.a. Lincoln Memorial Cemetery) in Milwaukee. His wife Dena A. Smith was appointed to succeed him.

Notes

}

People from Oconto, Wisconsin
Marquette University alumni
University of Wisconsin–Oshkosh alumni
Businesspeople from Wisconsin
State treasurers of Wisconsin
1889 births
1957 deaths
20th-century American politicians
20th-century American businesspeople